2022–23 European North Basketball League is the second season of the European North Basketball League, a regional basketball competition patronised by FIBA.

In this season there will be 15 teams from 8 countries (Poland, Lithuania, Latvia, Estonia, Czech Republic, Ukraine, Kosovo and Israel). They are divided into two groups.

Ukraine, Israel and Kosovo will have a debutant in this competition, while Russian and Belarus teams are banned from competition this season, due to 2022 Russian invasion of Ukraine.

Teams 
1st, 2nd, 3rd etc. - positions in national championships.

NOTE: KK Dunav from Serbia withdrew due to internal political reasons.

Regular season

Group A

Group B

Playoffs
Each tie in the quarter-finals phase is played over two legs. The winning teams qualify for the Final Four tournament.

Quarter-finals 

|}

Awards

Season awards

References

External links
Official website

European North Basketball League
ENBL
2022–23 in Estonian basketball
2022–23 in Latvian basketball